Oskar Mikael Rönningberg (born 2 April 1986) is a Swedish former professional footballer who played as a centre back. He represented Helsingborgs IF between 2006 and 2008 before his career was cut short because of an injury. He won two caps for the Sweden national team in 2008.

Club career

Early career 
Rönningberg started off his career with Torns IF in Lund, helping his youth team finish fourth in the 2001 season of Pojkallsvenskan. In 2002, Rönningberg left Torns IF to sign with the Allsvenskan club Helsingborgs IF. In 2006 he became the first ever former Torns IF player to play in Allsvenskan.

Helsingborgs IF

2006 season 
Rönningberg made his Allsvenskan debut for Helsingborg on 2 May 2006 in a home game against Östers IF, which Helsingborg won 4–0. During his first senior season with the club, he played in 11 Allsvenskan games and was an unused substitute in the 2006 Svenska Cupen final as Helsingborg won the 2006 Svenska Cupen title.

2007 season 
In 2007, Rönningberg made another 11 Allsvenskan appearances and was a part of the Helsingborg team that competed in the 2007–08 UEFA Cup. On 8 November 2007, he played in all 90 minutes as Helsingborg beat Galatasaray 3–2 away. He played in all four UEFA Cup group stage games as Helsingborgs IF advanced to the Round of 32 before being eliminated by PSV Eindhoven.

Injury and retirement 
In a pre-season friendly game in March 2008 against SK Brann, Rönningberg suffered a severe knee injury with 15 minutes left of the game. The injury made Rönningberg miss the entire 2008 season, and ultimately forced him to announce his retirement from professional football in September 2008 at the age of 22.

International career 
After having represented the Sweden U17, U19, and U21 teams, Rönningberg made his full international debut for Sweden on 13 January 2008 in a friendly game against Costa Rica, replacing Behrang Safari in the 68th minute in game that Sweden won 1–0. He won his second and final international cap six days later in a friendly game against the United States, playing for 61 minutes before being replaced by Safari in a game that Sweden lost 2–0.

Career statistics

Club

International

Honours 
Helsingborgs IF
 Svenska Cupen: 2006

References

1986 births
Swedish footballers
Helsingborgs IF players
Living people
Sweden international footballers
Association football defenders
Torns IF players
Sportspeople from Lund